Wadh is a
City in the Khuzdar District of Balochistan, Pakistan. The population of the City was 480,950 according to the 2017 census. Most of the inhabitants of the sub-district belong to the Mengal tribe . The land of Wadh is agricultural and cultivated. The source of income of the people of Wadh is mainly farming and mining. The majority of the people in the area are Muslims, with a small Hindu minority.

Education
The Govt. Boys High school and College Wadh have been established in Wadh Town by government of Balochistan.
 Lasbela University of Agriculture, Water and Marine Sciences Wadh Campus, Khuzdar
 Wadh Student Library

Health
The Civil hospital Wadh Town provides health facilities to the people of Wadh Town and Tehsil Wadh.

Geography

Wadh is in the mountainous region between the Kalat plateau and the plains of Sindh.
The climate is semi-arid, although occasionally subject to flooding, with warm summers and mild winters. Agriculture is a major economic activity, followed by livestock farming.

The area of Wadh is rich in mineral resources, with large deposits of barite, chromite, magnesite, manganite. The region where the town lies is also said to be rich in oil and gas, although the tense political situation has inhibited exploitation.

Wadh was in Jhalawan state until 1 March 1974, when Wadh was re-defined as a sub-district within the Khuzdar.

History

The mountainous area of Khuzdar and particularly Wadh has a turbulent history from earliest times, which continues today. The remains of many ancient sites and cave paintings of prehistoric period show the ancientness of Wadh and its surroundings. The Tharia Cave Paintings are situated in area of Wadh near Pallimas Valley. 

The Mengal people of Khuzdar speak Brahui, a Dravidian language, although most of their neighbors speak Iranian languages. They have retained their distinctive identity while being periodically subjugated to the Arab empire, Balochistan, India, Persia or Afghanistan. The British took control starting in 1839. In 1948 Balochistan became part of Pakistan.

N-25 National Highway

The N-25 National Highway, which connects Balochistan with all the provinces and their cities and especially Pakistan-Iran-Turkey, passes through the town of Wadh and continues through the Mengal dominated area. The Highway is 813 km long and stretches from Karachi-Lasbela-Khuzdar-Wadh-Kalat-Mastung-Quetta-Chaman and further onto Iran and Afghanistan. The highway also runs down to recent connection to Gwadar. The highway further connects to many towns in Balochistan and the highway to Multan, Islamabad in Punjab and Peshawar in the North-West Frontier Province.

Over 150 commercial vans and coaches move between the port city of Karachi and Quetta. It is a key route to and through Balochistan. The highway was constructed under a treaty between Pakistan, Iran and Turkey and was first constructed during the regime of Sardar Attaullah Mengal as Chief Minister of Balochistan. The town of Wadh is some 380 km south of Quetta, the capital city of Balochistan.

References

Populated places in Khuzdar District